Rotana Mousica is a free-to-air satellite TV channel and part of the Rotana Group network. It was launched in 2003. 
It is a music channel in the Arab world showcasing the latest exclusive Khaliji, Egyptian and Arabic songs and rolling out the hits.

The format of Rotana Mousica also features programs covering all aspects of the music industry including news of the stars, entertainment events and concerts, and the performance of songs on the charts.

Mousica's slogan in Arabic  means "Don't miss it".

External links

Television stations in the United Arab Emirates
Arabic-language television stations
Direct broadcast satellite services